Maxwell Reed Piepgrass (born April 7, 2004) is a Canadian soccer player who plays as a midfielder.

Early life
Piepgrass played youth soccer with the Calgary Foothills. In 2019, he played for Team Alberta at the Western Canada Summer Games. He became part of the Cavalry FC U20 development squad and in August 2020 was invited to train with the club's first team during the 2020 season.

University career
In November 2021, he committed to Cape Breton University to play for the men's soccer team beginning in the fall of 2022.

Club career
In August 2021, he signed a developmental contract with Cavalry FC in the Canadian Premier League. He made his professional debut for the club on August 11 against Pacific FC.

International career
In April 2022, Piepgrass was called up to the Canadian Under-20 side for two matches against Costa Rica.

References

External links
 

Living people
2004 births
Canadian soccer players
Association football midfielders
Cavalry FC players
Canadian Premier League players